Henry John Newman (born 1989) is a former joint interim head coach at Barnet.

Career
Newman joined Barnet in 2009 as assistant coach for the under-18s team while completing a degree in economics and philosophy at the London School of Economics. Newman achieved five "A" grades at A Level. 

Newman left Barnet in 2011 to become under-15s coach at Charlton Athletic. He later coached at Brentford before re-joining Barnet in 2014 to become the youngest academy manager in the country.

He was appointed joint interim manager at Barnet on 1 December 2016, alongside Rossi Eames. Eames took sole charge for a win over Morecambe on 14 February 2017 and, the following day, Newman's departure from the club was announced.

In August 2019, Newman, along with business partner Rory Campbell, made a bid to purchase Bury F.C. through their company C&N Sporting Risk shortly before the club's deadline to show proof of funds to the English Football League. This bid fell through and Bury were expelled from the EFL.

Managerial statistics

References

1989 births
Living people
Alumni of the London School of Economics
English football managers
English Football League managers
Charlton Athletic F.C. non-playing staff
Brentford F.C. non-playing staff
Barnet F.C. non-playing staff
Barnet F.C. managers
Sportspeople from Birmingham, West Midlands